Kulseh may refer to:
 Kulseh-ye Olya
 Kulseh-ye Sofla